Valmadrera is a comune (municipality) in the Province of Lecco in the Italian region Lombardy, located about  northeast of Milan and about  west of Lecco.  

Valmadrera borders the following municipalities: Canzo, Civate, Galbiate, Lecco, Malgrate, Mandello del Lario, Valbrona.

Twin towns — sister cities
Valmadrera is twinned with:

  Châteauneuf-les-Martigues, France, since 2000
  Weißenhorn, Germany, since 2017

References

Cities and towns in Lombardy